Ronald van Prooijen  was the original singer of the Dutch heavy metal band Picture.

Ronald started out in the band Fragma. He originally sang and played a little guitar but decided to stick to singing. He had been hanging around with Laurens Bakker and Rinus Vreugdenhil as they went through various incarnations of what was to become Picture. By 1979, he and Jan Bechtum had joined the band for their first stable (and the classic) lineup. He finally left the band after the second album.

Ronald's main influence was Ritchie Blackmore's Rainbow with Ronnie James Dio as the singer.

In late 2007, Ronald and the original members of Picture teamed up for a reunion rehearsal. It went so well that they decided to continue rehearsing for some concert dates, and considered recording a new album in early 2008. Though ultimately Pete Lovell became Picture's permanent lead singer, Ronald is still active musically and is the singer for the Dutch band Roslynn.

References

External links 
 Biography van Picture in Dutch on popinstituut.nl

Dutch male singers
Living people
Year of birth missing (living people)